Sugar Hill may refer to:

Places 
In the United States:
 Sugar Hill, Georgia, a city
 Sugar Hill, New Hampshire, a town
 Sugar Hill, Manhattan, New York, a section of Harlem
 Sugar Hill (New York), a mountain in Schuyler County
 Sugar Hill, Pennsylvania, an unincorporated community
 Sugar Hill Historic District (Detroit), Michigan
 Sugar Hill (club), a blues and jazz club in San Francisco
 Sugar Hill (Jacksonville), Florida, a historic African-American neighborhood in Jacksonville, Florida

Film and television 
 Sugar Hill (1994 film), a drama starring Wesley Snipes as drug dealer Roemello Skuggs
 Sugar Hill (1974 film), a blaxploitation horror movie, later edited for TV and retitled The Zombies of Sugar Hill
 Sugar Hill (TV program), the 1999 pilot for the sitcom Battery Park

Companies 
 Sugar Hill Records, a label whose artists include Nickel Creek and Chris Hillman
 Sugar Hill Records (hip hop label), an early hip hop label, whose artists included The Sugarhill Gang
 SugarHill Recording Studios, Houston, Texas

Music 
 "Sugar Hill", written and sung by Dolly Parton on her album Halos & Horns
 "Sugar Hill", a 1995 single by AZ that also appeared on his album Doe or Die

See also
 The Sugarhill Gang, an American hip hop group